Luis Marquina ( 25 May 1904 Barcelona- 26 June 1980 Madrid) was a Spanish film director and screenwriter.

Selected filmography
 The Dancer and the Worker (1936)
 Whirlwind (1941)
 Malvaloca (1942)
 Captain Poison (1951)
 Come Die My Love (1952)
 The Floor Burns (1952)
 Such is Madrid (1953)
 High Fashion (1954)
 Congress in Seville (1955)
 Where Are You Going, Alfonso XII? (1959)
 Alfonso XII and María Cristina (1960)
 The Viscount (1967)
 The King is the Best Mayor (1974)

References

External links 
 

1904 births
1980 deaths
People from Barcelona
Spanish film directors
Spanish film producers
Spanish male writers
Male screenwriters
20th-century Spanish screenwriters
20th-century Spanish male writers